Fernanda Caroline da Silva (born 2 November 1993), known as Fernandinha or just Fernanda, is a Brazilian footballer who plays as an attacking midfielder for Corinthians.

Club career

Born in Jundiaí, São Paulo, Fernanda began her career with Saad São Caetano in 2009. After playing for Palmeiras and Centro Olímpico, she moved to Sweden ahead of the 2012 season, signing for Assi IF.

On 7 December 2018, after seven consecutive seasons at Assi, Fernanda joined Piteå IF. On 4 January 2021, she moved to Vittsjö GIK, but left the club at the end of the season, to return to her home country.

On 2 February 2022, Fernanda was announced at Santos. A starter during the most of the campaign, she left the club on 21 December, and signed for Corinthians seven days later.

References

1993 births
Living people
People from Jundiaí
Brazilian women's footballers
Women's association football midfielders
Campeonato Brasileiro de Futebol Feminino Série A1 players
Sociedade Esportiva Palmeiras (women) players
Associação Desportiva Centro Olímpico players
Santos FC (women) players
Sport Club Corinthians Paulista (women) players
Damallsvenskan players
Elitettan players
Assi IF players
Piteå IF (women) players
Vittsjö GIK players
Brazilian expatriate women's footballers
Brazilian expatriate sportspeople in Sweden
Expatriate women's footballers in Sweden